"Hypnotized" is a 2007 song and the second single from Plies' debut album, The Real Testament. The track is produced by Akon, as well as featured. The video for the single was released. The single made the top twenty of the Billboard Hot 100, at #14. The song is featured on the soundtrack of the film Step Up 2 the Streets. A remix version was released featuring Rick Ross, Flo Rida and Webbie with a mixed beat.

Music video
Directed by Gil Green, the video features Plies and Akon at a party in which Plies is attracted by women shaking their bodies that it makes him feel like he's going into a trance when seeing them.

Charts

Weekly charts

Year-end charts

Certifications

References

External links
 

2007 singles
Akon songs
Plies (rapper) songs
Dirty rap songs
Songs written by Akon
Song recordings produced by Akon
Songs written by Plies (rapper)
Music videos directed by Gil Green
2007 songs
Atlantic Records singles